The Bordello in Rio or The Women's House of Rio is a 1927 silent drama film directed by Hans Steinhoff and starring Vivian Gibson, Albert Steinrück and Hans Stüwe. It was based on a novel by Norbert Jacques which was remade twice as Blondes for Export (1950) and Final Destination: Red Lantern (1960). In the United States, the film was re-edited by Bud Pollard and released as Girls for Sale.

The film's sets were designed by the art directors Otto Erdmann and Hans Sohnle. It was shot at the Babelsberg Studio in Berlin and on location in Hamburg.

Synopsis
A gang of white slavers lure young women to Rio de Janeiro to work as nightclub performers then force them to work as prostitutes.

Main cast

References

Bibliography

External links

1927 films
1927 drama films
German drama films
Films of the Weimar Republic
German silent feature films
Films directed by Hans Steinhoff
Films set in Rio de Janeiro (city)
Films about prostitution in Brazil
Films based on German novels
German black-and-white films
Films shot at Babelsberg Studios
Silent drama films
1920s German films